San Pietro Martire or St Peter Martyr is a Gothic architecture, Roman Catholic church, linked at one time to an adjacent Dominican convent in Vigevano, Province of Pavia, region of Lombardy, Italy.

The church was initially constructed in 1363, and attributed to a Bartolino da Novara. In 1446, the Dominican order took possession and under the patronage of Filippo Maria Visconti enlarged the church, converting the old nave into transept. The new church was consecrated in 1480. Further reconstructions occurred in 19th-century.

The nave has pilasters leading to gothic tracery. The interior has a number of decaying 16th-century frescoes. The chapels on the right are dedicated to St Cristopher (patron of one of the two parishes in Vigevano), St Anthony of Padua, St Vincent Ferrer, the Trinity, and the Crucifixion. On the left, they are dedicated to St Peter Martyr, St Joseph, St Dominic, St Pius V, and the Virgin of the Mercies. The altarpieces in the chapels are also by unknown artists.

During the rule of Galeazzo Maria Sforza, patron of this church,  the Blessed monk Matteo Carrerio came to live in Vigevano, and died in October 1470 in the adjacent convent. His remains were held in the church. The Blessed Matteo is one of the patrons of Vigevano.

References

Churches in Vigevano
Gothic architecture in Lombardy
15th-century Roman Catholic church buildings in Italy